The Nemuro Peninsula (根室半島 Nemuro-hantō) is a peninsula which extends from the east coast of Hokkaidō, Japan. Cape Nosappu at its tip is the easternmost point of Hokkaidō. The northern coastline is on Nemuro Bay, while the south faces the Pacific Ocean. Islands of the Habomai (Khabomai) Archipelago, administered by Russia but claimed by Japan, extend eastward from the peninsula.

Climate
Most of the Nemuro Peninsula has a humid continental climate (Köppen climate classification Dfb). However, due to the influence of the Seasonal lag, the midsummer season is often scheduled from the end of August to the beginning of September. For example, spring in Cape Nosappu often doesn't arrive until the end of May, and in some years winter doesn't even end until the end of June. In 1983, due to the continuous cold wave, the winter in the area did not end until the end of July, and in August it immediately entered the summer; at the same time, the maximum temperature in June 1983 did not exceed .

See also
 Kuril Islands dispute
 1973 Nemuro earthquake
 Nemuro Peninsula Chashi Sites

References

External links
 
Nosappumisaki::Easternmost point

Tourist attractions in Hokkaido
Peninsulas of Japan
Landforms of Hokkaido